Siebold or von Siebold is a German surname: 

 Carl Caspar von Siebold (1736–1807), surgeon
 Regina von Siebold (1771–1849), obstetrician 
 Adam Elias von Siebold (1775–1828), medical doctor
 Charlotte von Siebold (1788–1859), gynaecologist 
 Philipp Franz von Siebold (1796–1866), German physician, significant for his study of Japanese flora and fauna; standard author abbreviation Siebold
 Eduard Caspar Jacob von Siebold (1801–1861), medical doctor
 Karl Theodor Ernst von Siebold (1804–1885), German physiologist and zoologist
 Alexander von Siebold (1846–1911) was a German translator and interpreter active in Japan
 Heinrich von Siebold (1852–1908), German diplomat and anthropologist
 Percival Siebold (1917–1983), British scouting administrator
 Peter Siebold (born 1971), American commercial astronaut

See also
 Seabold, a surname
 Sebald (disambiguation)
 Sebold (disambiguation)
 Seibold, a surname
 Sypolt, a surname

German-language surnames
Surnames from given names

de:Siebold